Pat Cramer (born 21 March 1947) is a former professional tennis player from South Africa. He enjoyed most of his tennis success while playing doubles. During his career, he won three doubles titles.

Career finals

Doubles (3 titles, 1 runner-up)

External links
 
 
 

South African male tennis players
1947 births
Living people
White South African people
Place of birth missing (living people)
Miami Hurricanes men's tennis players